William Orr Leitch FRSE FRSGS MICE (d.1948) was a Scottish civil engineer responsible for building sections of the Peking-Mukden railway and consequently serving as both its Chief Engineer and Manager. He was involved in the Mukden Incident of 1931.

Life
Little is known of his early life other than that he was "from Edinburgh".

In 1937 he was elected a Fellow of the Royal Society of Edinburgh. His proposers were Gilbert MacIntyre Hunter, Douglas Guthrie, Alfred Henry Roberts, and Sir Thomas Hudson Beare.

He died on 27 January 1948.

Family

He married Katherine MacIntyre, sister of Major Hugh Ross MacIntyre DSO Mc and bar.

Publications

Railway Construction in North China (1905)

References

 

1948 deaths
British civil engineers
Engineers from Edinburgh
Fellows of the Royal Society of Edinburgh
Scottish non-fiction writers